Longfork is an unincorporated community in Dickenson County, Virginia, in the United States.

History
A post office was established at Longfork in 1924, and remained in operation until it was discontinued in 1949. Longfork was named from the nearby Long Fork Creek.

References

Unincorporated communities in Dickenson County, Virginia
Unincorporated communities in Virginia